Bangsia is a genus of Neotropical birds in the tanager family Thraupidae. They are native to humid forests in Colombia, Ecuador, Panama and Costa Rica.

Taxonomy and species list
The genus Bangsia was introduce in 1919 by the ornithologist Thomas Edward Penard with a subspecies of the blue-and-gold tanager Buthraupis arcaei caeruleigularis as the type. The specific epithet was chosen to honour the American ornithologist Outram Bangs. A molecular phylogenetic study published in 2014 found that the genus Bangsia was sister to the genus Wetmorethraupis which contains only a single species, the orange-throated tanager.

The genus contains six species:

 Blue-and-gold tanager, Bangsia arcaei
 Black-and-gold tanager, Bangsia melanochlamys
 Golden-chested tanager, Bangsia rothschildi
 Moss-backed tanager, Bangsia edwardsi
 Gold-ringed tanager, Bangsia aureocincta
 Yellow-green tanager, Bangsia flavovirens

References

 
Bird genera
Taxa named by Thomas Edward Penard